Below is a list of team squads at the African Basketball Championships in 2007.

4 - Olímpio Cipriano - (Primeiro de Agosto) 
5 - Armando Costa - (Primeiro de Agosto) 
6 - Carlos Morais - (Petro Atlético) 
7 - Mílton Barros - (Petro Atlético) 
8 - Luis Costa - (Petro Atlético) 
9 - Victor de Carvalho - FC Gaia Basquetebol 
10 - Joaquim Gomes - (Primeiro de Agosto) 
11 - Victor Muzadi - (Primeiro de Agosto) 
12 - Felizardo Ambrósio - (Primeiro de Agosto) 
13 - Carlos Almeida - (Primeiro de Agosto) 
14 - Miguel Lutonda - (Primeiro de Agosto) 
15 - Eduardo Mingas - (Petro Atlético)

António Moreira - (University of Massachusetts-Dartmouth) 
 Odair Sanches
 Agildo Cabral - (Pantera Negra Sal) 
 Aquiles Semedo - (ABC) 
 Mário Correia - (Maia Basket) 
 Antonio Monteiro
 Marques Houtman - (FC Porto) 
 Aldevino Lima - (Benfica) 
 Mário Jorge - (CAB Madeira) 
 Victor Hugo - (ABC) 
 Tony Barros - (University of Massachusetts-Boston) 
 Rodrigo Mascarenhas - (Primeiro de Agosto)

4 - Valery Kajeguhakwa - (Patriotic Army) 
5 - Karim Nkusi
6 - Rene Gakari - (Patriotic Army) 
7 - Louis Mugunga
8 - Bertrand Muhire
9 - Manix Auriantal - (Quebec City Kebekwa) 
10 - Hamza Ruhezamihigo
11 - Trinon Mutabaruka
12 - Rob Thomson - (Makedonikos Kozani) 
13 - Gaylord Ndugu
14 - Edouard Miller
15 - Aboubakar Barame

4 - Soufiane Kourdou - (AS Sale) 
5 - Mustapha Khalfi - (RCA Casablanca) 
6 - Boutouris Zouheir - (ASS Rabat) 
7 - Zakaria Masbahi - (TSC Casablanca) 
8 - Nabil Bakkas - (MAS Fes) 
9 - Mohamed Mouak - (FUS Rabat) 
10 - Mounir Bouhlal - (IRT Tanger) 
11 - Reda Rhalimi - (Al Gezira) 
12 - Houari Bassim - (MAS Fes) 
13 - Adnan Musaadia - (RCA Casablanca) 
14 - Abderrahim Najah - (RCA Casablanca) 
15 - Younes Idrissi - (Iona College)

El Kabir Pene - (Stade Clermontois Basket Auvergne) 
 Alpha Traore - (MAS Fes) 
 Mohammed Seck - (AS Douanes Dakar) 
 Mouhammad Faye - (Georgia Tech) 
 Bamba Fall - (Southern Methodist University) 
 Maleye N'Doye - (JDA Dijon Bourgogne) 
 Mamadou Diouf - (Sendai 89ers) 
 Jules Aw - (Sion Herens Basket) 
 Issa Konare - (Vermont Frost Heaves) 
 Pape Sow - (Solsonica Rieti) 
 Malick Badiane - (Artland Dragons Quakenbrueck) 
 Makhtar N'Diaye - (Levallois SCB)

Guy Serge Toualy - (ABC Abidjan) 
 Philippe Koffi
 Cedric Kouadiou
 Souleyman Diabate - (JDA Dijon Bourgogne) 
 Stephane Konate - (ABC Abidjan) 
 Eric N'Tape - (ES Saint-Martin D'Heres) 
 Amadou Dioum - (Limoges CSP Elite) 
 Mamery Diallo - (Stade Clermontois Basket Auvergne) 
 Rodrigue Djahue - (Saint Vallier Basket Drome) 
 Serge Afeli - (Kansas State University) 
 Bangoura Morlaye - (ABC Abidjan) 
 Ismael N'Diaye - (Florida International University)

Alou Badra Sanogo - (Djoliba Athletic Club) 
 Bassekou Diallo - (AS Real Bamako) 
 Lamine Diawara - (Al Ittihad Aleppo) 
 Modibo Diarra - (Cape Cod Frenzy) 
 Modibo Niakate - (Chorale de Roanne Basket) 
 Namory Diarra - (Stade Malien) 
 Paul Dakouo - (Al Ahli Sports Club) 
 Salif Niangado - (ASCC BOPP) 
 Sory Diakite - (Al Nahda) 
 Samake Soumaila - (Zhejiang Wanma Cyclones) 
 Waly Coulibaly - (Stade Malien) 
 Nouha Diakite - (Adecco ASVEL Lyon-Villeurbanne)

Ashraf Rabie - (Al Ittihad Alexandria) 
 Ibrahim El Gamali - (Al Ahly) 
 Karim Shamseia
 Mohamed El Garhy - (Al Ahly) 
 Ramy Gunady - (Al Gezira) 
 Tarek El Ghanam - (Al Ahly) 
 Wael Badr - (Al Zamalek) 
 Ahmed El-Said - (Al Zamalek) 
 Sherif Smara
 Mohamed Mustafa
 Amir Fannan
 Mohamed El Manin

Abdulrahman Mohammed - (Kenney's Bullets) 
 Aloysius Anagonye - (Premiata Montegranaro) 
 Chamberlain Oguchi - (University of Oregon) 
 Churchill Odia - (University of Oregon) 
 Ibrahim Yusuf - (Dodan Warriors) 
 Ejike Ugboaja - (Ydra Asfalistiki ENAD Agios Dometios) 
 Abe Badmus - (Bucknell University) 
 Deji Akindele - (Fort Worth Flyers) 
 Olumide Oyedeji - (Al Kuwait SC) 
 Stanley Gumut - (Yelwa Hawks Bauchi) 
 Tunji Awojobi - (Gilboa/Afula/Migdal Haemek)

Christian Siris - (AS Mazanga) 
 Dieudonne Mbesse
 Fabrice Mokotemapa
 Guy Joseph Kodjo - (ES Prisse Macon) 
 Junior Madozein - (ASOPT) 
 Junior Pehoua - (Hampton University) 
 Lionel Bomayako - (Longwy-Rehon B.C.) 
 Max Mombollet - (Orcines) 
 Olivier Vivies - (JA Vichy Val d'Allier Auvergne) 
 Regis Koundjia - (The George Washington University) 
 Asrangue Souleymane - (University of New Orleans) 
 Severino Febou

John Bing - (LPRC Oilers) 
 Jethro Bing - (LPRC Oilers) 
 Varney Tulay - (Dream Team) 
 Marcus Wolo - (LPRC Oilers) 
 Fitgerald Cole - (NPA Pythons) 
 Alphonso Kuiah - (NPA Pythons) 
 Raphael Quaye - (NPA Pythons) 
 Alvin Tapeh - (NPA Pythons) 
 Mark Smith - (NPA Pythons) 
 Joseph Lackey - (Uhuru Kings) 
 Richelieu Allison - (Uhuru Kings) 
 Samuel Assembe - (Pretoria Heat)

Mali Alimasi - (Kauka Kinshasa) 
 Tshimpaka Kadima - (InterClub Brazzaville) 
 Gege Kizubanata - (ASA) 
 Mutombo Lukusa - (Onatra Kinshasa) 
 Ndala Mutombo - (Kauka Kinshasa) 
 Lifetu Selengue - (Interclube) 
 Yohan Lokanga
 Djo Yele - (Tshwane Suns) 
 Eyenga Christian - (Onatra Kinshasa) 
 Mabilama Samuna - (Onatra Kinshasa) 
 Isasi Ndelo - (Onatra Kinshasa) 
 Kabangu Tshimanga - (Mazembe Katanga)

Benjamin Manhanga - (Desportivo Maputo) 
 Custodio Muchate - (Clube Ferroviário de Maputo) 
 Edgar Machava
 Edson Monjane
 Fernando Mandlate - (Clube de Desportos do Maxaquene) 
 Helenio Machanguana
 Ivan Gouveia
 Luis Barros - (Associação Académica de Maputo) 
 Nelson Jossias
 Octavio Magolico - (Clube Ferroviário de Maputo) 
 Ricardo Alipio - (Clube Ferroviário de Maputo) 
 Stelio Nuaila

Ali Amri - (Club Africain) 
 Amine Rezig - (Stade Nabeulien) 
 Atef Maoua - (J.S.Kairouan) 
 Fouhed Stiti - (U.S.Monastir) 
 Hamdi Braa - (Étoile du Sahel) 
 Marwen Laghnej - (J.S.Kairouan) 
 Majdi Maalaouli - (Stade Nabeulien) 
 Naim Dhifallah - (Club Africain) 
 Nizar Knioua
 Omar Mouhli - (E.O.G.Kram) 
 Walid Dhouibi - (Étoile du Sahel) 
 Radhouane Slimane - (Étoile du Sahel)

Alexandre N'Kembe - (La Rochelle Rupella 17) 
 Brice Vounang - (SPO Rouen Basket) 
 Christian Bayang - (Phoenix de Douala) 
 Jean-Pierre Elong
 Joachim Ekanga-Ehawa - (ES Chalon-Sur-Saone) 
 Joseph Owona - (JSA Bordeaux Basket) 
 Luc Richard Mbah a Moute - (University of California at Los Angeles) 
 Franck Ndongo - (Virginia Commonwealth University) 
 Parfait Bitee - (University of Rhode Island) 
 Patrick Bouli - (Manhattan College) 
 Romeo Dide Tatchoum - (Brinkford Tbilisi) 
 Gaston Essengue - (University of Nevada - Las Vegas)

Quintin Denyssen - (Egoli Magic) 
 Neo Mothiba - (Soweto Panthers) 
 Lesego Molebatsi - (Egoli Magic) 
 Joseph Mazibuko - (Egoli Magic) 
 Nyakallo Nthuping - (Tshwane Suns) 
 Kenneth Motaung - (Soweto Panthers) 
 Thabang Kgwedi - (Soweto Panthers) 
 Patrick Engelbrecht
 Tsakane Ngobeni - (Hamilton College) 
 Vusumuzi Dlamini - (Kwazulu Marlins) 
 Lowell Mndaweni - (Kwazulu Marlins) 
 Thabo Letsebe - (Soweto Panthers)

See also
 2007 FIBA Africa Championship for Women squads

References
 AfricaBasket

2007 squads
Squads